Diospage rhebus is a moth of the subfamily Arctiinae. It was described by Pieter Cramer in 1779. It is found in Venezuela, Brazil and Peru.

References

Euchromiina
Moths described in 1779